Zilkale is a medieval castle located in the Fırtına Valley (literally "Storm Valley") within the Pontic Mountains, and is one of the most important historical structures in the Çamlıhemşin district of Rize Province, within the Black Sea Region of Turkey.

It is believed that the castle was built between the 14th and 15th centuries. The castle consists of the outer walls, middle walls and the inner castle. There are garrison quarters, and a possible chapel and head tower. According to Anthony Bryer, it is an Armenian chapel that was built by the Empire of Trebizond for the local Lord of Hamshenis.

Etymology 
Zilkale: Zil means "bell" and kale means "castle" in Turkish (Zilkale = "Bell Castle").

Alternatively:

Zirkale: Zir means "lower" in Persian and kale means "castle" in Turkish (Zirkale = "Lower Castle").

Notes

External links

All about the region
Zilkale pics
HQ Zilkale image
About Region 

Buildings and structures in Rize Province
Empire of Trebizond
Tourist attractions in Rize Province
Byzantine fortifications in Turkey